Vriesea guttata is a species of flowering plant in the Bromeliaceae family. It is endemic to Brazil.

Cultivars
 Vriesea 'Cherry Bow'
 Vriesea 'Cupid's Bow'
 Vriesea 'Donneaina'
 Vriesea 'Golden Plaits'
 Vriesea 'Inspektor Perring'
 Vriesea 'Karamea Granada'
 Vriesea 'Lav (Lavender)'
 Vriesea 'Petersiana'
 Vriesea 'Regent'
 Vriesea 'Sanderiana'
 Vriesea 'Wingding'

References

BSI Cultivar Registry Retrieved 11 October 2009

guttata
Flora of Brazil
Taxa named by Édouard André
Taxa named by Jean Jules Linden